The 2014–15 UEFA Champions League was the 60th season of Europe's premier club football tournament organised by UEFA, and the 23rd season since it was renamed from the European Champion Clubs' Cup to the UEFA Champions League.

The final was played at the Olympiastadion in Berlin, Germany, with Spanish side Barcelona defeating Italian side Juventus 3–1 to win their fifth title and complete an unprecedented second continental treble. Real Madrid were the title holders, but they were eliminated by Juventus in the semi-finals.

This season was the first where clubs must comply with UEFA Financial Fair Play Regulations in order to participate. Moreover, this season was the first where a club from Gibraltar competed in the tournament, after the Gibraltar Football Association was accepted as the 54th UEFA member at the UEFA Congress in May 2013. They were granted one spot in the Champions League, which was taken by Lincoln Red Imps, the champions of the 2013–14 Gibraltar Premier Division.

On 17 July 2014, the UEFA emergency panel ruled that Ukrainian and Russian clubs would not be drawn against each other "until further notice" due to the political unrest between the countries. Another ruling centred in regional instability was also made where Israeli teams were prohibited from hosting any UEFA competitions due to the 2014 Israel–Gaza conflict. The rules regarding suspension due to yellow card accumulation were also changed such that all bookings expired on completion of the quarter-finals and were not carried forward to the semi-finals. Moreover, this was the first season in which vanishing spray was used.

Association team allocation
A total of 77 teams from 53 of the 54 UEFA member associations participated in the 2014–15 UEFA Champions League (the exception being Liechtenstein, which do not organise a domestic league). The association ranking based on the UEFA country coefficients was used to determine the number of participating teams for each association:
Associations 1–3 each have four teams qualify.
Associations 4–6 each have three teams qualify.
Associations 7–15 each have two teams qualify.
Associations 16–54 (except Liechtenstein) each have one team qualify.
The winners of the 2013–14 UEFA Champions League were given an additional entry as title holders if they would not qualify for the 2014–15 UEFA Champions League through their domestic league (because of the restriction that no association can have more than four teams playing in the Champions League, if the title holders are from the top three associations and finish outside the top four in their domestic league, the title holders' entry comes at the expense of the fourth-placed team of their association). However, this additional entry was not necessary for this season since the title holders qualified for the tournament through their domestic league.

Association ranking
For the 2014–15 UEFA Champions League, the associations are allocated places according to their 2013 UEFA country coefficients, which takes into account their performance in European competitions from 2008–09 to 2012–13.

Distribution
Since the title holders Real Madrid qualified for the Champions League group stage through their domestic league (as the third-placed team of the 2013–14 La Liga), the group stage spot reserved for the title holders is vacated, and the following changes to the default allocation system are made:
The champions of association 13 (Switzerland) are promoted from the third qualifying round to the group stage.
The champions of association 16 (Austria) are promoted from the second qualifying round to the third qualifying round.
The champions of associations 47 (Northern Ireland) and 48 (Wales) are promoted from the first qualifying round to the second qualifying round.

Teams
League positions of the previous season shown in parentheses (TH: Title holders).

Notes

Round and draw dates
The schedule of the competition is as follows (all draws held at UEFA headquarters in Nyon, Switzerland, unless stated otherwise).

The final date of 6 June could cause problems for South American international players called up to play in the 2015 Copa América, which begins on 11 June. FIFA international rules require clubs to release players 14 days prior to the start of an international tournament, which means the players would have to miss the Champions League final if the rules were enforced. If the players were allowed to play in the Champions League final, that would leave them as few as five days to travel and train prior to playing in the Copa América.

Qualifying rounds

In the qualifying rounds and the play-off round, teams were divided into seeded and unseeded teams based on their 2014 UEFA club coefficients, and then drawn into two-legged home-and-away ties. Teams from the same association could not be drawn against each other.

First qualifying round
The draw for the first and second qualifying rounds was held on 23 June 2014. The first legs were played on 1 and 2 July, and the second legs were played on 8 July 2014.

Second qualifying round
The first legs were played on 15 and 16 July, and the second legs were played on 22 and 23 July 2014.

Third qualifying round
The third qualifying round was split into two separate sections: one for champions (Champions Route) and one for non-champions (League Route). The losing teams in both sections entered the 2014–15 UEFA Europa League play-off round.

The draw for the third qualifying round was held on 18 July 2014. The first legs were played on 29 and 30 July, and the second legs were played on 5 and 6 August 2014.

Play-off round

The play-off round was split into two separate sections: one for champions (Champions Route) and one for non-champions (League Route). The losing teams in both sections entered the 2014–15 UEFA Europa League group stage.

The draw for the play-off round was held on 8 August 2014. The first legs were played on 19 and 20 August, and the second legs were played on 26 and 27 August 2014.

Group stage

The draw for the group stage was held in Monaco on 28 August 2014. The 32 teams were allocated into four pots based on their 2014 UEFA club coefficients, with the title holders being placed in Pot 1 automatically. They were drawn into eight groups of four, with the restriction that teams from the same association could not be drawn against each other.

In each group, teams played against each other home-and-away in a round-robin format. The matchdays were 16–17 September, 30 September–1 October, 21–22 October, 4–5 November, 25–26 November, and 9–10 December 2014.

A total of 18 national associations were represented in the group stage. Ludogorets Razgrad and Malmö FF made their debut appearances in the group stage. For the first time since the 1995–96 season, England's Manchester United did not qualify for the group stage.

Teams that qualified for the group stage also participated in the 2014–15 UEFA Youth League, a competition available to players aged 19 or under.

The group winners and runners-up advanced to the round of 16, while the third-placed teams entered the 2014–15 UEFA Europa League round of 32. See 2014–15 UEFA Champions League group stage for tiebreakers if two or more teams are equal on points.

Group A

Group B

Group C

Group D

Group E

Group F

Group G

Group H

Knockout phase

In the knockout phase, teams played against each other over two legs on a home-and-away basis, except for the one-match final. The mechanism of the draws for each round was as follows:
In the draw for the round of 16, the eight group winners were seeded, and the eight group runners-up were unseeded. The seeded teams were drawn against the unseeded teams, with the seeded teams hosting the second leg. Teams from the same group or the same association could not be drawn against each other.
In the draws for the quarter-finals onwards, there were no seedings, and teams from the same group or the same association could be drawn against each other.

Bracket

Round of 16
The draw for the round of 16 was held on 15 December 2014. The first legs were played on 17, 18, 24 and 25 February, and the second legs were played on 10, 11, 17 and 18 March 2015.

|}

Quarter-finals
The draw for the quarter-finals was held on 20 March 2015. The first legs were played on 14 and 15 April, and the second legs were played on 21 and 22 April 2015.

|}

Semi-finals
The draw for the semi-finals and final (to determine the "home" team for administrative purposes) was held on 24 April 2015. The first legs were played on 5 and 6 May, and the second legs were played on 12 and 13 May 2015.

|}

Final

Statistics
Statistics exclude qualifying rounds and play-off round.

Top goalscorers

Top assists

Squad of the season
The UEFA technical study group selected the following 18 players as the squad of the tournament:

See also
2014–15 UEFA Europa League
2015 UEFA Super Cup
2015 FIFA Club World Cup
2014–15 UEFA Women's Champions League
2014–15 UEFA Youth League

References

External links

2014–15 UEFA Champions League
2014/15 UEFA Champions League season review

 
1
2014-15